The Cité du Vin is a museum as well as a place of exhibitions, shows, movie projections and academic seminars on the theme of wine located in Bordeaux, France.

Construction

Architects 
The architects were Anouk Legendre and Nicholas Desmazières of XTU Agency.

Cost 
The cost of the construction has been underestimated. In January 2011, the cost of the construction had been estimated at 63 million euros excluding taxes. But at the end of 2014, as the construction was in progress, the cost of the structure has been re-evaluated to reach 81.1 million euros excluding taxes.

Opening 
Its official opening by the President of France François Hollande and Alain Juppé took place on May 31, 2016. It was followed by the public opening on June 1, 2016.

Transportation 
The Cité du Vin is accessible by tram (the Cité du Vin tram stop is on line B of the Bordeaux tramway), by the ring road, by the Pont Jacques Chaban-Delmas and by lines 7 and 32 of the Transports Bordeaux Métropole (TBM) network. A stop of the Batcub is located nearby.

Gallery

References 

Culture of Bordeaux
Wine museums
Auditoriums
Museums in Bordeaux